Belfast Lower is a barony in County Antrim, Northern Ireland. To its east lies the east-Antrim coast and Belfast Lough, and it is bordered by four other baronies: Belfast Upper to the south, Carrickfergus to the east, Antrim Upper to the west; Glenarm Upper to the north. The Forth and Milewater rivers both flow through Belfast Lower, with Larne harbour also situated in the barony.

Roughfort
Roughfort is a medieval motte located in the barony which was used as an assembly point for the United Irishmen who were under the command of Henry Joy McCracken prior to the Battle of Antrim on 7 June 1798. Thousands of Presbyterians from the surrounding area of the Six Mile Water valley rose up and fought in the battle. Opposite the motte is a Liberty Tree, an American tradition where revolutionary notices where pinned to a tree. Whilst Liberty Trees in Ireland were planted in 1798, it is speculated that the one at Roughfort may have been planted the following year.

List of settlements
Below is a list of settlements in Belfast Lower:

Towns
Ballyclare (split with barony of Antrim Upper)
Newtownabbey
Larne (Belfast Lower portion)

Villages
Ballycarry
Ballynure
Ballyrobert
Ballystrudder
Glynn
Whitehead

Population centres
Browns Bay
Magheramorne
Mossley
Straid
Whitewell

List of civil parishes
Below is a list of civil parishes in Belfast Lower:
Ballylinny
Ballymartin (split with barony of Belfast Upper)
Ballynure
Carnmoney
Glynn
Kilroot
Inver
Island Magee
Raloo
Shankill (split with barony of Belfast Upper)
Templecorran
Templepatrick (split with barony of Belfast Upper)

References

 
Clandeboye